Gusevo is a rural locality (a selo) and the administrative center of Gusevsky Selsoviet, Abzelilovsky District, Bashkortostan, Russia. The population was 1,102 as of 2010. There are 7 streets.

Geography 
Gusevo is located 22 km southeast of Askarovo (the district's administrative centre) by road. Avnyash is the nearest rural locality.

References 

Rural localities in Abzelilovsky District